Issa/Issah Samir (born July 26, 1989) is a Ghanaian boxer who won silver in the bantamweight division at the 2007 All-Africa Games and qualified for the 2008 Summer Olympics. He is the brother of light-heavyweight Bastir Samir.

Career
At the All Africa Games he lost the final to local Algerian Abdelhalim Ouradi. At the first qualifier he lost to Hicham Mesbahi, but won the second African qualifier beating southpaw Bruno Julie in the final. He lost his Olympic debut to Héctor Manzanilla 10:13. As a professional he won the Ghanaian National Super Welterweight Champion against Ishmael Tetteh on September 29, 2012, and also won an IBF Super Welterweight Youth World Title against Robizon Omsarashvili of Georgia on May 3, 2013, via TKO round 3 at the Accra Sports Stadium. Issah won the title coming into the fight as an undefeated with 12 fights with 11 ko's.

External links
 Olympic qualifier
 AllAfrica games

Living people
Bantamweight boxers
1989 births
Boxers at the 2008 Summer Olympics
Olympic boxers of Ghana
Ghanaian male boxers
African Games silver medalists for Ghana
African Games medalists in boxing
Competitors at the 2007 All-Africa Games